Be mig! Se mig! Ge mig! is a 2013 studio album by Elisa's. The album peaked at number three on the Swedish Albums Chart.

Track listing 
Be mig! Se mig! Ge mig!
Take Me Home Country Roads
Sanna mina ord
När jag ser mig tillbaks
Det ska gudarna veta
Fångad av en blick från dig
Varje litet andetag
Morfars grammofon
Den känslan
Om du vill
Den som gick i dina kläder
Diamonds Are a Girls Best Friend
Lever min dröm

Charts

References 

2013 albums
Elisa's albums
Swedish-language albums